Professor Kool's Fun Skool aired on WMAR-TV in Baltimore on Saturday mornings from 1967 to 1977  and was hosted by Stu Kerr.  It was a children's show featuring different kids each week.

With giant floppy shoes, an academic's robe and mortarboard, floppy bow tie, glasses, mustache and a glossy black bob, Kerr was transformed into the loony teacher who made kids believe they liked school because, as he sang to the tune of "Jingle Bells," "it’s lots of fun."

We like school
We like school - cause it's lots of fun.
Singing, laughing, playing games,
Blues are on the run.

We like school
We like school - love to hear the bell.
For our teacher Professor Kool,
Let's give him a great big yell !!!

Another of the weekly features was when children were selected from the audience to play the Pie Face game using the Hasbro toy of the same name. The contestants would line up to stick their faces through the pie hole and yell "SOCK IT TO ME! ... SOCK IT TO ME!" while turning the cranks.

Professor Kool had a nemesis named Miss Spiderweb, a silent, stealthy witch-like wraith who wreaked havoc in the classroom who was played by John Ziemann. Ziemann was a studio technician who was with WMAR for 35 years. As the villain of the show, Miss Spiderweb was frequently the target of the kids on the set and at personal appearances. In fact, he sustained injuries on the set that sent him to the emergency room on three occasions.

One of the shows favorable highlights was Professor Kool’s reading of the lunch menu; a long scroll with wacky unappealing descriptions would have the classmates sounding disgusted.

After Professor Kool went off the air, Stu Kerr was on a show called Caboose, which featured a young puppeteer named Kevin Clash, better known today as the man behind Elmo.

References

1960s American children's television series
1967 American television series debuts
1977 American television series endings
1970s American children's television series
Local children's television programming in the United States